The Jamur emo skink (Emoia jamur) is a species of lizard in the family Scincidae. It is found in Indonesia.

References

Emoia
Reptiles described in 1991
Reptiles of Indonesia
Endemic fauna of Indonesia
Taxa named by Walter Creighton Brown